Molakalmuru Sari, also known as Karnataka Kanchipuram, is the traditional silk sari that is weaved in Molakalmuru, Chitradurga district, Karnataka, India. In 2011, it was granted a Geographical Indication tag and its tag number is 53. The motifs include that of fruits, animals, and flowers.

See also
Ilkal saree
Byadagi chilli
Mysore Sandalwood Oil
Navalgund Durries
Coorg orange

References

Saris
Chitradurga district
Culture of Karnataka
Geographical indications in Karnataka